There are two types of vestibular glands, both are structures found near and in the vagina :
 the greater, or major, vestibular glands are also known as Bartholin's glands;
 the lesser, or minor vestibular glands also known as Skene's glands.